Holostrophus bifasciatus is a species of polypore fungus beetle in the family Tetratomidae. It is found in North America.

This is the only Nearctic species within the subfamily Eustrophinae with a characteristic, quadrimaculate, elytral color pattern. Elytra is typically dark with quad, lighter-colored areas.

References

Further reading

External links

 

Tenebrionoidea
Articles created by Qbugbot
Beetles described in 1824